Haagalavaadi is a town in the Tumkur District of the Indian state of Karnataka. It belongs to the Bangalore Division. It is located 50 km from the district headquarter, Tumkur. Bangalore is the nearest Metropolitan Area to Hagalavadi.

History

The founder of Haagalavaadi dynasty was Erimada Nayaka. He was succeeded by Sali Nayaka (1508-1544), who expanded the territory considerably. Inscription  Ck 38, dated 1696, relates to these two leaders. Hagalavadi is the headquarters of Palegar lineage. Chikkanayakanahalli was founded by Erimada Nayaka and named after his brother as Chikkanayaka (younger brother).

References

Cities and towns in Tumkur district
Articles with unsourced statements from May 2021